"Lash Out" is a song by German-Canadian-English singer Alice Merton.

Production 
Merton co-wrote the song with songwriter Dave Bassett. The song was released through Paper Plane Records and Mom + Pop Music on 30 May 2018 with a music video. The song includes a guitar-heavy track similar to Merton's other singles "No Roots" and "Hit The Ground Running." The single was included in the American re-release of Merton's EP No Roots. The music video was co-directed by Max Nadolny and Jonas Stark, with shots recorded in Berlin and South Africa.

Charts

Weekly charts

Year-end charts

Certifications

References

2018 songs
2018 singles
English songs
Songs written by Dave Bassett (songwriter)